Wilhelm Mader, O. Praem. (died 1450) was a Roman Catholic prelate who served as Auxiliary Bishop of Augsburg (1447–1450).

Biography
Wilhelm Mader was ordained a priest in the Order of Canons Regular of Prémontré. On 29 Mar 1447, he was appointed during the papacy of Pope Nicholas V as Auxiliary Bishop of Augsburg and Titular Bishop of Adramyttium. On 16 Apr 1447, he was consecrated bishop by Nicolas Cesari, Bishop of Tivoli, with Antonio Severini, Bishop of Gubbio, and Simeon de Valle, Bishop of Ossero, serving as co-consecrators. He served as Auxiliary Bishop of Augsburg until his death in 1450.

References 

15th-century Roman Catholic bishops in Bavaria
Bishops appointed by Pope Nicholas V
1450 deaths
Premonstratensian bishops